Bowling at the 26th Southeast Asian Games will be held at Ancol Bowling, Jakarta, Indonesia.

Medal summary

Men

Women

Medal table

2011 Southeast Asian Games events
Southeast Asian Games
2011